Storlandet is the main island of the former Nagu municipality (now part of Pargas, Southwest Finland) in Western Finland.

Finnish islands in the Baltic
Pargas
Landforms of Southwest Finland